Berea station could refer to:

 Berea Union Depot, a disused train station in Berea, Ohio
 Berea Fire Station, a building in Johannesburg, South Africa